Disa aurata is a species of orchid found in Swellendam area of Cape Province, South Africa at elevations of 0 – 1000 meters.

References

External links

 
 
 

aurata
Orchids of South Africa